Charles Panati (born March 13, 1943) is a former college professor, industrial physicist, author and science editor of Newsweek.

Biography 

Panati was born in Baltimore, Maryland, and raised in Atlantic City, New Jersey. After graduating from Villanova University (1961–65) with a B.S. in physics, Panati obtained a master's degree in Radiation Health Physics (1966) from Columbia University and worked in cancer research at the Columbia Presbyterian Hospital. Panati is openly gay.

Parapsychology 

After joining Newsweek in 1971, Panati became interested in parapsychology and published his first book, Supersenses: Our Potential For Parasensory Experience (1974), which described parapsychological research into extrasensory perception. The book was described in a review as a respectable survey of psi phenomena but "the skeptic will remain unconvinced... because the subject is not amenable to rational, empirical scrutiny." Panati later met the Israeli psychic Uri Geller, who suggested Panati collect and publish 22 research papers by scientists around the world who had investigated the spoon-bender's alleged abilities. The Geller Papers (1976), edited by Panati, caused controversy when it was published. Several prominent magicians came forward to demonstrate that Geller’s so-called psychic talents could be easily duplicated by stage magicians. Science writer Martin Gardner wrote that Panati had been fooled by Geller's trickery and The Geller Papers were an "embarrassing anthology". In Death Encounters (1979), Panati investigated the phenomenon of clinical death, in which subjects report being drawn toward a white light while wrestling with the will to live. Pittsburgh Post-Gazette writer Wendy Thompson Warner wrote that, "His views on parapsychology have, rightly or wrongly, been the target of widespread skepticism in the scientific community."

Origins book series 

Panati has written a series of books about the origins of ordinary, everyday things, beginning in 1984 with The Browser’s Book of Beginnings. He wrote a second book, Extraordinary Origins of Everyday Things in 1987 that was praised as "excellent bathroom reading". Subsequent books in the series were Panati’s Parade of Fads, Follies and Manias: The Origins of Our Most Cherished Obsessions in 1991, Sacred Origins of Profound Things: The Stories Behind the Rites and Rituals of the World’s Religions in 1996, Sexy Origins of Intimate Things in 1998, and Words To Live By: Origins of Common Wisdom Expressions in 1999.

His book Extraordinary Origins of Everyday Things has been described as a "handy reference". Panati's Sacred Origins of Profound Things received a positive review and was described as "an informative and entertaining book on the origins of religious ideas, sacred items, worship practices, holy symbols, and holidays."

The Silent Intruder: Surviving the Radiation Age

In 1981, Panati and his brother, Michael Hudson, wrote The Silent Intruder: Surviving the Radiation Age, a book that seeks to examine the interaction of radiation and human tissue.

Media 

Panati has appeared as a guest on Oprah, Regis and Letterman.

Publications 

Words To Live By, Viking Penguin, 1999
Sexy Origins and Intimate Things, Viking Penguin, 1998
Sacred Origins of Profound Things, Viking Penguin, 1996
Panati’s Parade of Fads, Follies and Manias, HarperCollins, 1991
Extraordinary Endings of Practically Everything and Everybody, HarperCollins, 1989
Extraordinary Origins of Everyday Things, HarperCollins, 1987
The Browser’s Book of Beginnings, Houghton Mifflin, 1984
The Pleasuring of Rory Malone, St. Martin’s Press, 1982
The Silent Intruder: Surviving the Radiation Age, Houghton Mifflin, 1981
Breakthroughs, Houghton Mifflin, 1980
Death Encounters, Bantam, 1979
Links, Houghton Mifflin, 1978
The Geller Papers, Houghton Mifflin, 1976
Supersenses, Quadrangle/The New York Times, 1974

References

Further reading 

Ray Hyman. (1976). Review of The Geller Papers, edited by Charles Panati. Zetetic 1: 73-80.

1943 births
American science journalists
American male journalists
Columbia University staff
Columbia University alumni
Living people
Parapsychologists
American gay writers
21st-century LGBT people